Chuanshan is a town in Huanjiang Maonan Autonomous County, Guangxi, China.

Administrative division
As of 2021, the town is divided into two communities and eighteen villages: 
Youdong Community
Mulun Community
Linlang
Tongban
Duchuan
Gubin
Wuwei
Xiarong
Donggan
Dingji
Leyi
Chajiang
Tangwan
Xiajiu
Dongshan
Xiagan
Xiafeng
Baidan
Shecun
Hedun

History
During the Qing dynasty (1644–1911), it belonged to Si'en County.

In 1933 during the Republic of China, Youdong Township was founded.

In 1951, it was under the jurisdiction of the 3rd District. In 1955, Tongshan District was set up. In 1958, it was renamed Chuanshan People's Commune and then Chuanshan District in 1962. It was incorporated as a township in 1984. In 1997, it was upgraded to a town. In 2005, Mulun Township was merged into the town.

Geography
The town lies at the northwestern of Huanjiang Maonan Autonomous County, bordering Nandan County to the west, Xianan Township to the south, Libo County to the north, and Luoyang Town to the east.

There are four rivers in the town: Dagou River, Shecun River, Duchuan River, and Gubin River.

Economy
The economy is supported primarily by agriculture and mineral resources. Significant crops include rice and corn. Sugarcane is one of the important economic crops in the region. The region abounds with iron, lead, zinc and arsenopyrite.

Demographics

The 2019 census reported the town had a population of 47,613.

Transportation
The Provincial Highway S205 passes across the eastern town.

Tourist attractions
Chuanshan Temple was a Buddhist temple in the town, originally built by a monk from Emei Mountain, and was completely destroyed by the Red Guards during the ten-year Cultural Revolution.

References

Bibliography

 

Divisions of Huanjiang Maonan Autonomous County